Yi Yuanji (Wade-Giles: I Yüan-chi) (c. 1000, Changsha, Hunan – c. 1064)  was a Northern Song Dynasty painter, famous for his realistic paintings of animals. According to Robert van Gulik, Yi Yuanji's paintings of gibbons were particularly celebrated.

The 11th-century critic  Guo Ruoxu in his Overview of Painting (图画见闻志, Tuhua Jian Wen Zhi) tells this about Yi's career:

He spent months roaming the mountains of southern Hubei and northern Hunan, watching roebucks and gibbons in their natural environment.

In 1064, Yi Yuanji was invited to paint screens in the imperial palace. Once this job has been completed, the Yingzong Emperor, impressed, commissioned him to paint the Picture of a Hundred Gibbons, but unfortunately the artist died after painting only a few gibbons. A few of his other gibbon paintings have survived, and Robert van Gulik, quite familiar with the behavior of this ape, comments on how naturally they look in the pictures. His other work includes depictions of deer, peacocks, birds-and-flowers and fruits-and-vegetables; many of them are kept in the National Palace Museum in Taipei. The Monkey and Cats painting is especially charming. Van Gulik identifies the monkey as a macaque. This painting was featured on a 2004 "Year of the Monkey" stamp from Saint Vincent and the Grenadines.

The image of Yi Yuanji, with his intimate knowledge of nature, has attracted attention from modern Chinese painters.

References

Song dynasty painters
Animal artists
1000s births
1064 deaths
Artists from Changsha
Painters from Hunan